The 2007 Western Illinois Leathernecks football team represented Western Illinois University as a member of the Gateway Football Conference during the 2007 NCAA Division I FCS football season. They were led by ninth-year head coach Don Patterson and played their home games at Hanson Field in Macomb, Illinois. The Leathernecks finished the season with a 6–5 record overall and a 3–3 record in conference play, tying for third place in the Gateway.

Schedule

References

Western Illinois
Western Illinois Leathernecks football seasons
Western Illinois Leathernecks football